Hvozd is a municipality and village in Rakovník District in the Central Bohemian Region of the Czech Republic. It has about 200 inhabitants.

Administrative parts
The village of Žďáry is an administrative part of Hvozd.

References

Villages in Rakovník District